The 1996 Prince Edward Island general election was held on November 18, 1996. It was the first election in the province's history to not use multi-member constituencies, and instead elect a single member in each of 27 districts. (Previously, since 1873 the province had been divided into 15 or 16 districts, each electing two members.) 

The governing Liberals of Premier Keith Milligan, who had been in power since Joe Ghiz first won government in 1986, lost to the resurgent Progressive Conservatives under their new leader, Pat Binns.

This was also the first election where a party other than the Liberals or Tories won a seat in the Legislature, with New Democratic Party leader Herb Dickieson winning a three-way race in a Prince County riding.

This election was the only one in PEI history where a party formed government without winning a majority of the vote until the 2015 election.

Party standings

Members elected

|-
|bgcolor="whitesmoke"|1. Souris-Elmira
||
|Andy Mooney1,287
|
|Ross Young1,159
|
|Brian MacDonald54
||
|Ross Young & Roger Soloman†1st Kings
|-
|bgcolor="whitesmoke"|2. Morell-Fortune Bay
||
|Kevin MacAdam1,347
|
|Walter Bradley1,269
|
|Kathy Murphy40
||
|Walter Bradley & Claude Matheson†2nd Kings
|-
|rowspan=3 bgcolor="whitesmoke"|3. Georgetown-Baldwin's Road
|rowspan=3|
|rowspan=3|Michael Currie1,463
|rowspan=3|
|rowspan=3|Rose Marie MacDonald1,182
|rowspan=3|
|rowspan=3|Patricia Allen43
||
|Peter Doucette† & Roberta Hubley†3rd Kings
|-
|colspan=2 bgcolor=whitesmoke align=center|Merged riding
|-
||
|Rose Marie MacDonald & Barry Hicken‡5th Kings
|-
|bgcolor="whitesmoke"|4. Montague-Kilmuir
||
|Jim Bagnall1,259
|
|Beverly Deelstra964
|
|Janet Gillis71
|colspan="2" style="text-align:center;"|New District
|-
|bgcolor="whitesmoke"|5. Murray River-Gaspereaux
||
|Pat Binns1,309
|
|Barry Hicken1,022
|
|Alan Hicken112
||
|Stanley Bruce †4th Kings
|-
|bgcolor="whitesmoke"|6. Belfast-Pownal Bay
||
|Wilbur MacDonald1,275
|
|Lynwood MacPherson1,242
|
|Edith Perry99
||
|Lynwood MacPherson4th Queens
|-
|bgcolor="whitesmoke"|7. Glen Stewart-Bellevue Cove
||
|Pat Mella2,357
|
|Mary Hughes914
|
|Pat Burgoyne146
|rowspan=2 |
|rowspan=2|Pat Mella (PC) & Tom Dunphy† (Lib) 3rd Queens
|-
|bgcolor="whitesmoke"|8. Tracadie-Fort Augustus
||
|Mildred Dover1,511
|
|Alan McIsaac1,279
|
|Suzanne Gibler90
|-
|bgcolor="whitesmoke"|9. Stanhope-East Royalty
||
|Jamie Ballem1,625
|
|Eddie Reardon1,404
|
|Leo Cheverie165
|colspan="2" style="text-align:center;"|New District
|-
|bgcolor="whitesmoke"|10. Sherwood-Hillsborough
||
|Elmer MacFadyen1,585
|
|Larry Hughes1,212
|
|Ronald Kelly207
|rowspan=3 |
|rowspan=3|Wayne Cheverie   5th Queens
|-
|bgcolor="whitesmoke"|11. Parkdale-Belvedere
||
|Chester Gillan1,584
|
|Stephen Dowling1,008
|
|Larry Duchesne169
|-
|bgcolor="whitesmoke"|12. Charlottetown-Kings Square
|
|Brian McKenna1,075
||
|Wayne Cheverie1,345
|
|Sybil Frei363
|-
|bgcolor="whitesmoke"|13. Charlottetown-Rochford Square
|
|Jeff Lantz1,242
||
|Paul Connolly1,348
|
|Mark Forrest226
|rowspan=2 |
|rowspan=2|Paul Connolly  6th Queens
|-
|bgcolor="whitesmoke"|14. Charlottetown-Spring Park
||
|Wes MacAleer1,481
|
|Ian MacDonald1,119
|
|Leo Broderick862
|-
|bgcolor="whitesmoke"|15. Winsloe-West Royalty
||
|Don MacKinnon1,751
|
|Perley MacNeill1,575
|
|James Rodd190
|colspan="2" style="text-align:center;"|New District
|-
|bgcolor="whitesmoke"|16. North River-Rice Point
|
|Brian Dollar1,606
||
|Ron MacKinley1,958
|
|Marlene Hunt224
||
|Gordon MacInnis‡ & Ron MacKinley2nd Queens
|-
|bgcolor="whitesmoke"|17. Crapaud-Hazel Grove
||
|Norman MacPhee1,666
|
|Eric MacArthur1,529
|
|J'Nan Brown312
||
|Marion Murphy†1st Queens
|-
|bgcolor="whitesmoke"|18. Park Corner-Oyster Bed
||
|Beth MacKenzie1,824
|
|Gordon MacInnis1,652
|
|Gerard Gallant187
|colspan="2" style="text-align:center;"|New District
|-
|bgcolor="whitesmoke"|19. Borden-Kinkora
||
|Eric Hammill1,521
|
|Stavert Huestis1,310
|
|Gerard Sexton195
||
|Stavert Huestis & Libbe Hubley† 4th Prince
|-
|bgcolor="whitesmoke"|20. Kensington-Malpeque
||
|Mitch Murphy2,020
|
|Bill Campbell1,312
|
|Calvin Roberts227
|colspan="2" style="text-align:center;"|New District
|-
|bgcolor="whitesmoke"|21. Wilmot-Summerside
||
|Greg Deighan1,506
|
|Walter McEwen1,394
|
|Bill McKinnon492
|rowspan=2 |
|rowspan=2|Walter McEwen & Nancy Guptill 5th Prince
|-
|bgcolor="whitesmoke"|22. St. Eleanors-Summerside
|
|Gardiner MacNeill1,145
||
|Nancy Guptill1,716
|
|Marsha Arseneault307
|-
|bgcolor="whitesmoke"|23. Cascumpec-Grand River
|
|Barry Balsom715
||
|Keith Milligan1,823
|
|Donna Lewis162
||
|Keith Milligan 2nd Prince
|-
|bgcolor="whitesmoke"|24. Evangeline-Miscouche
|
|Gerard Richard735
||
|Robert Maddix1,519
|
|Gerard Bernard188
||
|Robert Maddix 3rd Prince
|-
|bgcolor="whitesmoke"|25. West Point-Bloomfield
|
|Gary Morgan695
|
|Fairley Yeo783
||
|Herb Dickieson921
|colspan="2" style="text-align:center;"|New District
|-
|bgcolor="whitesmoke"|26. Alberton-Miminegash
|
|Eddie Trail1,127
||
|Hector MacLeod1,351
|
|Ed Kilfoil175
|rowspan=2 |
|rowspan=2|Bobby Morrissey & Hector MacLeod 1st Prince
|-
|bgcolor="whitesmoke"|27. Tignish-DeBlois
|
|Gail Shea1,149
||
|Bobby Morrissey1,413
|
|Howard Waite56
|}

See also

2000 Prince Edward Island general election
List of Prince Edward Island general elections (post-Confederation)
List of PEI political parties

Sources

Further reading
 

1996 elections in Canada
Elections in Prince Edward Island
1996 in Prince Edward Island
November 1996 events in Canada